Chop Shop is a 2004 crime novel by American writer and speaker Tim Downs. It was published in 2004 by Howard Books and was preceded by Shoofly Pie.

Plot 
This thriller features Nick “Bug Man” Polchak, a forensic entomologist who deduces clues to murders based on evidence left by insects on the victims. The heterochromiac Dr. Riley McKay of the Allegheny County coroner's office becomes suspicious while analyzing several corpses. She asks Polchak for help, who discovers that a Pittsburgh-based black market in transplant organs seems to be fronted by PharmaGen, a genetics company with interests other than DNA.

Origin 
Chop Shop is the second in a series of Christian suspense novels featuring “Bug Man” Polchak.

References

2004 American novels
American crime novels
Novels set in Pittsburgh